Simi Valley Town Center is a lifestyle center located in Simi Valley, California. It was owned and operated by Forest City Enterprises. The mall was sold to Alberta Development Partners and Walton Street Capital in 2010. The retail center opened in 2005 with Macy's and Robinsons-May as anchor stores; the latter was converted into a Macy's Men's and Home store on September 9, 2006. The complex was designed by the architectural firm F+A Architects to resemble a hillside Italian village.

The center is home to KWSV-LP, a non-commercial low-power FM radio station known as "99.1 The Ranch" that launched in 2015 with a country music format.

It is also home of the Skateboarding Hall of Fame Museum.

On January 4, 2017, Macy's announced that it would be closing the Men's and Home store, consolidating those departments with the existing women's store at a later date. The closure is part of a restructuring effort that involves closing 68 stores and eliminating more than 10,000 jobs nationwide.

References

External links

Town Center
Forest City Realty Trust
Shopping malls in Ventura County, California
Shopping malls established in 2005
Economy of Simi Valley, California